I Want My Phone Back is an American game show web series that premiered on November 2, 2016, on Comcast Watchable. In 2017, it was subsequently picked up by Facebook Watch where it has since aired two seasons.

The series was created by Luke Kelly-Clyne and is hosted by Alana Johnston. The show's team of improvisers include Blake Rosier, Inessa Frantowski, Brandon Gardner, Laci Mosely, Kausar Mohammed, and Oscar Montoya.

Premise
I Want My Phone Back follows host "Alana Johnston and a cast of improv performers take to the streets of Los Angeles, giving passersby the chance to win up to $1,000 — by handing over their mobile phones and letting the show’s pranksters post to social media, and text and call their contacts. The longer contestants stay in the game, the more money they make."

Production

Development
The series originated as a short video entitled I Want My Phone Back: The Scariest Game Show Ever that was produced by Big Breakfast for CollegeHumor and initially released on YouTube on November 13, 2015. The short was created by Luke Kelly-Clyne, directed by Todd G. Bieber, and featured Brandon Gardner as host.

The video proved to be quite successful on CollegeHumor's YouTube channel where it quickly earned a million views. After testing how the idea could be turned into a 30-minute TV show or 10-minute web series, the series was sold to streaming service Comcast Watchable.

On August 22, 2016, it was announced that the short had been developed into a series and that Comcast Watchable had ordered a first season consisting of ten episodes. It premiered on November 2, 2016.

In September 2017, it was reported that Comcast was reassessing their Watchable platform and planning to de-emphasize over-the-top distribution, and halt future work centered on Watchable originals including I Want My Phone Back.

Move to Facebook Watch
In mid-2017, it was announced that the series had been picked up for two new seasons by Facebook Watch. The first of those ten episode seasons premiered on August 29, 2017.

Episodes

Season 1 (2016)

Season 2 (2017)

Season 3 (2017-18)

Reception

Viewers
Since launching on Facebook Watch on August 29, 2017, I Want My Phone Back has accumulated more than 370,000 followers. By January 2018, the show's reach topped 12 million. In addition, the show ranks seventh in overall engagement, its interaction rate stands at 9%, and 11% of all followers like, share or comment on content.

Awards and nominations
The series was included in Paste Magazines list of the 10 Best Comedy Web Series in 2016.

References

External links

Official Watchable website

Facebook Watch original programming
2010s American reality television series
2016 American television series debuts
English-language television shows
American non-fiction web series
2018 American television series endings